Bjarte Andre Lunde Aarsheim (born 14 January 1975) is a Norwegian football coach and former player. He is currently head coach of Eliteserien club Viking FK. 

Having spent most of his playing career at Viking, Lunde Aarsheim is the player with the eighth most appearances for the club throughout history. In a playing career that lasted from 1993 to 2012, he also played for Start, Randaberg and Hundvåg, having the role of player-coach at the latter two. In 2001, he made three appearances for the Norway national team. In addition to his coaching roles at Randaberg and Hundvåg, Lunde Aarsheim has also been a coach at Sandnes Ulf and Brodd.

Club career

Viking
Lunde Aarsheim has spent the majority of his career at Viking FK, arriving from local club Hundvåg as a youth. Making his debut for Viking in 1994, he stayed with the club until 2005, playing a total of 425 games in all competitions, including friendly matches. A creative midfielder, Lunde Aarsheim was at his peak during the 2001 season, when he, as captain, led Viking to a league lead before suffering a serious ankle injury in a game against SK Brann halfway through the season. Although he made an extremely popular five-minute comeback in the Norwegian cup final victory over rivals Bryne FK later in the year, Lunde Aarsheim never really recovered from the injury, and his last seasons at Viking were plagued by further injuries. He only played 4 games in the 2002 season, and he was injured for parts of the 2003 season as well.

Start
He remained captain of Viking until the end of the 2004 season, but midway through the 2005 season he was released on a free transfer, joining league leaders IK Start. Start finished the season in 2nd place.

Randaberg
In the summer of 2007 he surprisingly joined Randaberg IL, a club playing in the 3. divisjon, the fourth tier of Norwegian football, together with Øyvind Svenning. The team earned promotion to the 2. divisjon in his first season at the club. In November 2008, Lunde Aarsheim and Jørgen Tengesdal were announced as the new head coaches of Ranadaberg, with Lunde Aarsheim taking on the role of player-coach. The team earned promotion to the Norwegian First Division in the 2010 season, which was also Lunde Aarsheim's last season before he decided to retire and leave the club.

After the 2010 season, he returned to his youth club Hundvåg to become a player developer.

In July 2011, he came out of retirement and returned to Randaberg in the Norwegian First Division. He played eight matches during the 2011 season.

International career
He made his national team debut in a 3–2 win against South Korea in January 2001, earning a total of three caps for Norway. His last international match was an August 2001 friendly match against Turkey.

Managerial career

Hundvåg
Ahead of the 2012 season, he again returned to Hundvåg, becoming the head coach of the club, and also playing two matches for the club in the 4. divisjon. The team earned promotion to the 3. divisjon in his first season at the club.

Sandnes Ulf
On 6 December 2013, he was appointed assistant coach of Tippeligaen club Sandnes Ulf, signing a one-year contract and becoming a part of head coach Asle Andersen's technical staff. In July 2014, Andersen got sacked, and Lunde Aarsheim served as interim head coach for one match against Molde FK. He resigned after the match.

Brodd
On 30 November 2014, Lunde Aarsheim was appointed head coach of 3. divisjon club IL Brodd. He stayed at Brodd for one season.

Viking
In Januar 2016, he was hired as a player developer for his former club Viking FK. Ten months later, in November 2016, he left his role as player developer to become assistant coach of the club, with Ian Burchnall becoming head coach. One year later, after the relegation of Viking to the Norwegian First Division, Burchnall was sacked, and Lunde Aarsheim led the team in the last two matches of the 2017 season. On 19 December 2017, Viking appointed Bjarne Berntsen as head coach, with Lunde Aarsheim continuing as an assistant coach. He served as an assistant coach under Berntsen for three seasons, in which the club earned promotion to the top division in 2018, and won the Norwegian Football Cup in 2019.

On 26 November 2020, it was announced that Bjarne Berntsen would leave Viking after the 2020 season. Simultaneously, it was announced that Lunde Aarsheim and Morten Jensen would replace Berntsen, taking over as joint head coaches on two-year contracts. Like Lunde Aarsheim, Jensen was also an assistant coach at the club before being appointed head coach. They took charge ahead of the 2021 season. Viking finished the 2021 season in third place, and on 25 March 2022, the head coaches' contracts were extended until the end of the 2025 season.

Career statistics

Notes

Managerial statistics

Honours
Viking
Norwegian Football Cup: 2001

References

1975 births
Living people
Sportspeople from Stavanger
Association football midfielders
Norwegian footballers
Norway international footballers
Norway youth international footballers
Norway under-21 international footballers
Viking FK players
IK Start players
Randaberg IL players
Eliteserien players
Norwegian First Division players
Norwegian Second Division players
Norwegian Third Division players
Norwegian Fourth Division players
Viking FK non-playing staff
Norwegian football managers
Viking FK managers
Eliteserien managers